Amber Dawn Frank (born December 2, 1998), formerly known professionally as Amber Montana, is an American actress. She is known for her role as Taylor Hathaway in the Nickelodeon series The Haunted Hathaways.

Biography 
Frank started acting at the age of 7 in Florida before she moved to California,  where she got her first minor role in the 2008 drama movie She Could Be You. Later on, she appeared in different TV shows. In 2012, she was cast for the lead role as Taylor in the Nickelodeon sitcom The Haunted Hathaways after she had auditioned eight times for that role. She currently resides in Santa Clarita, California. Frank is of Spanish and Cuban descent.

Filmography

Awards and nominations

References

External links

 

1998 births
American people of Cuban descent
American people of Spanish descent
21st-century American actresses
American child actresses
American film actresses
American television actresses
People from Santa Clarita, California
Living people